This is a list of railway stations served by the Bari metropolitan railway service.

 Aeroporto
 Bari Centrale
 Bitonto
 Bitonto SS. Medici
 Brigata Bari
 Cittadella
 Europa
 Fesca-San Girolamo
 Francesco Crispi
 Ospedale
 Palese
 Quintino Sella
 San Gabriele
 Tesoro

Metro
Bari